Modernizr is a JavaScript library that detects the features available in a user's browser. This lets web pages avoid unsupported features by informing the user their browser isn't supported or loading a polyfill. Modernizr aims to provide feature detection in a consistent and easy to use manner that discourages the use of failure-prone browser sniffing.

Overview
Many HTML5 and CSS 3 features are already implemented in at least one major browser. Modernizr determines whether the user's browser has implemented a given feature. This lets developers take advantage of new features that browsers support, yet create fallbacks for browsers that lack support. In both 2010 and 2011, Modernizr won the .net Award for Open Source App of the Year, and in 2011 one of its lead developers, Paul Irish, won the Developer of the Year award.

Function
Modernizr uses feature detection, rather than checking the browser's  property, to discern what a browser can and cannot do.  It considers feature detection more reliable since the same rendering engine may not necessarily support the same things in two different browsers using that engine.  In addition, some users change their user agent string to get around websites that block features for browsers with specific user agent settings, despite their browsers having the necessary capabilities.

Modernizr offers tests for more than 250 features, then creates a JavaScript object (named "Modernizr") that contains the results of these tests as boolean properties. It also adds classes to the HTML element based on what features are and are not natively supported.

To perform feature detection tests, Modernizr often creates an element, sets a specific style instruction on that element and then immediately tries to retrieve that setting. Web browsers that understand the instruction will return something sensible; browsers that don't understand it will return nothing or "undefined".  Modernizr uses the result to assess whether that feature is supported by the web browser.

Many tests in the documentation come with a small code sample to illustrate how a specific test can be used in web development workflow.

Running
When it runs, it creates a global object called Modernizr that contains a set of Boolean properties for each feature it can detect. For example, if a browser supports the canvas API, the Modernizr.canvas property will be true. If the browser does not support the canvas API, the Modernizr.canvas property will be false:
if (Modernizr.canvas) {
  // Let's draw some shapes...!
} else {
  // No native canvas support available :(
}

Limitations
The library is simply a feature-detection method and as such, does not add missing functionality to older browsers.

Examples

Modernizr JavaScript example 
<!DOCTYPE html>
<html class="no-js" lang="en">
<head>
  <title>Modernizr - JavaScript Example</title>
</head>
<body>
  <p id="result">Modernizr won't run if JavaScript is not enabled.</p>
</body>
  <script src="path/to/modernizr.js"></script>
  <script>
    elem = document.getElementById('result');
    if (Modernizr.websockets) {
        elem.innerHTML = 'Your browser supports WebSockets.';
    } else {
        elem.innerHTML ='Your browser does not support WebSockets.' ;
    }
  </script>
</html>

CSS example 
<!DOCTYPE html>
<html class="no-js" lang="en">
<head>
	<title>Modernizr - CSS Example</title>
	<style>
		.wsno,
		.wsyes,
		.js .no-js { display: none; }
		/* Modernizr will add one of the following classes to the HTML element based on
                   whether or not WebSockets is supported by the user's browser. */
		.no-websockets .wsno,
		.websockets .wsyes { display: block; }
	</style>
</head>
<body>
	<p class="wsno">Your browser does not support WebSockets.</p>
	<p class="wsyes">Your browser supports WebSockets.</p>
	<p class="no-js">Modernizr won’t run if javascript is not enabled.</p>
</body>
<script src="path/to/modernizr.js"></script>
</html>

See also

 List of JavaScript libraries

References

External links
 

JavaScript libraries
Web design
HTML
World Wide Web Consortium standards
Responsive web design
Software using the MIT license